TIT, Tit, Tits, or tit may refer to:

Birds 
 Tit (bird) or Paridae, a large family of passerine birds
 Bearded tit, a small reed-bed passerine bird
 Long-tailed tits or Aegithalidae, a family of passerine birds with long tails
 Tit-babbler or Macronus, a genus in the family Timaliidae
 Tit berrypecker, a species of bird in the family Paramythiidae
 Tit hylia, a species of bird in the family Cettiidae
 Tomtit, a small passerine bird of the family Petroicidae
 Wrentit, a small bird, the only species in the genus Chamaea

Places 
 Tin Tsz stop, a Light Rail stop in Hong Kong
 Tit, Adrar, a town in Adrar Province, central Algeria
 Tit, Tamanrasset, a village in Tamanrasset Province, southern Algeria
 Tit-e Olya, a village in West Azerbaijan Province, Iran
 Tehran International Tower, a residential tower located in Tehran, Iran

People 
 Jacques Tits (1930–2021), French/Belgian mathematician
 Tit (name), Romanian male given name 
 Tit Linda Sou (born 1989), female track and field sprint athlete who competes internationally for Cambodia
 Tit Štante (born 1998), Slovenian snowboarder

Mathematics 
 Tarski's indefinability theorem,  a theorem  which states that arithmetical truth cannot be defined in arithmetic
 Tits alternative, an important theorem about the structure of finitely generated linear groups
 Tits group, a finite simple group 2F4(2)′

Organizations 
 Technological Institute of Textile & Sciences, in Bhiwani, Haryana, India
 Tokyo Institute of Technology, a national top-tier research university located in Greater Tokyo Area, Japan
 Turkish Revenge Brigade or TİT, an ultra-nationalist militant organisation in Turkey

Other uses 
 Tit., abbreviation for the Epistle of Paul to Titus, part of the New Testament
 "Tits", a song by Sparks from Indiscreet, 1975
 "Tits", a song by The Stranglers from Black and White, 1978
 Teat, an organ in female mammals that produces milk to feed young offspring
 A vulgar dysphemism for a breast of a woman, usually used in the plural form
 Trotters Independent Traders, a fictional company  from the BBC sitcom Only Fools and Horses
 The Incredible True Story, the second studio album by American rapper Logic
 Titcoin, a cryptocurrency

See also 
 Titt (disambiguation) 
 Titty (disambiguation)

Animal common name disambiguation pages